Adolphe Berty (also known as Boulet; 13 May 1818, Paris – 18 August 1867, Paris) was a historiographer, archaeologist, historian of architecture, and French architect.

Berty was the founder of Parisian topography; he was also responsible for important work on the historiography of Paris. One of his main works is the Topographie historique du vieux Paris

External links 
 BERTY, Adolphe (dit BOULET, Adolphe Eugène Étienne) on INHA with complete list of publications
 Topographie historique du vieux Paris at Gallica and Internet Archive (IA):
 Région du Louvre et des Tuileries, Vol. 1 (1866): Gallica
 Région du Louvre et des Tuileries, Vol. 2 (1868): Gallica, IA (Getty Research Institute), IA (University of Illinois)
 Région du Louvre et des Tuileries, Vol. 1, 2nd ed. (1885): Gallica, IA (Getty Research Institute), IA (University of Toronto)
 Région du Louvre et des Tuileries, Vol. 2, 2nd ed. (1885): Gallica, IA (University of Toronto), IA (University of Toronto)
 Région du Bourg Saint-Germain [Vol. 3] (1876): Gallica, IA (Getty Research Institute), IA (University of Toronto)
 Région du Faubourg Saint-Germain [Vol. 4] (1882): Gallica, IA (Getty Research Institute), IA (University of Toronto)
 Région occidentale de l'Université [Vol. 5] (1887): Gallica, IA (Getty Research Institute),  IA (University of Toronto)
 Région centrale de l'Université [Vol. 6] (1897): Gallica, IA (Getty Research Institute), IA (University of Toronto)
 Les grands architectes français de la Renaissance (1860). Gallica, IA (Harvard University)
 Topographie historique du vieux Paris, par Adolphe Berty on Hathitrust 
 Berty, Adolphe (1818-1867) on IdRef

Writers from Paris
1818 births
French historiographers
1867 deaths
French archaeologists
19th-century French historians
19th-century French architects